A sunchime is a device analogous to a windchime but which uses sunlight instead of wind. A number of embodiments are documented, including:

 an architectural sculpture by Jeff G. Smith in Sandcastle Retreat, Clearwater, Florida using glass and steel elements suspended in a  skylight
 a large public work of art in AZ Mills Mall, Tempe, Arizona by Zischke Studio

References

Solar-powered devices